Vaughan Monroe Johnson (March 24, 1962 – December 12, 2019) was an American professional football player who was a linebacker in the National Football League (NFL) for the New Orleans Saints and Philadelphia Eagles. He also was a member of the Jacksonville Bulls in the United States Football League (USFL). He played college football at North Carolina State University.

Early years
Johnson attended West Carteret High School. He accepted a football scholarship from North Carolina State University.

Professional career
Johnson was selected by the Jacksonville Bulls in the 1984 USFL Territorial Draft, where he played the 1984 and 1985 USFL seasons.

He was also selected by the New Orleans Saints 15th overall in the 1984 NFL Supplemental Draft of USFL and CFL Players. He joined the Saints to play the 1986 NFL season after the USFL folded.

He was a four-time Pro Bowler from 1989 to 1992 while with the Saints and also a member of the vaunted Dome Patrol linebacker corps. In 2011, he was selected for the Louisiana Sports Hall of Fame.

Death
Johnson died from kidney disease on December 12, 2019, at age 57.

References

1962 births
2019 deaths
People from Morehead City, North Carolina
Players of American football from North Carolina
American football linebackers
National Conference Pro Bowl players
NC State Wolfpack football players
Jacksonville Bulls players
New Orleans Saints players
Philadelphia Eagles players
Deaths from kidney disease